Ruth Blay (June 10, 1737 – December 30, 1768)  was executed by hanging after being convicted of concealment of a stillborn illegitimate child, which was later found on the floor of the barn next to the house in which she was staying. She was not convicted of killing the baby. She was granted 3 reprieves before the execution. Blay was the last female executed by the state (then a colony) of New Hampshire.   She was executed by Thomas Packer, Portsmouth’s High Sheriff, who also oversaw the execution of Eliphaz Dow in 1755. 

Blay split her time between teaching in nearby towns and being a seamstress.

Ruth Blay's story is covered in an episode of the podcast Lore.

See also
 Capital punishment in New Hampshire
 Capital punishment in the United States
 List of people executed in New Hampshire

References

1737 births
1768 deaths
18th-century executions of American people
18th-century executions by the United States
Executed American women
People executed by the Province of New Hampshire
People from Haverhill, Massachusetts
People executed by New Hampshire by hanging
People executed by the Thirteen Colonies by hanging